Sainte-Sabine is a parish municipality in Les Etchemins Regional County Municipality in the Chaudière-Appalaches region of Quebec, Canada. Its population is 386 as of the Canada 2011 Census.

It is named after the Basilica of Saint Sabina at the Aventine, where cardinal Louis-Nazaire Bégin often went during his theology studies in Rome.

Demographics 

References

Commission de toponymie du Québec
Ministère des Affaires municipales, des Régions et de l'Occupation du territoire

Parish municipalities in Quebec
Incorporated places in Chaudière-Appalaches